The list of well-known geologic formations in the Philippines.

Stratigraphic groupings
 Ilocos-Central Luzon Basin
 Luzon Central Cordillera
 Cagayan Valley Basin
 Northern Sierra Madre
 Zambales Range
 Southern Sierra Madre
 Southwest Luzon Uplands
 Southeast Luzon Basin
 Southeast Luzon Arc (Recent)
 Southeast Luzon Arc (Ancient)
 North Palawan Block
 South Palawan Block
 Antique Range
 Iloilo Basin
 Negros Arc (Ancient)
 Negros Arc (Recent)
 Visayan Sea Basin
 Samar Block
 Leyte Central Highlands
 Leyte Gulfs
 Sulu-Zamboanga Arc
 Central Mindanao Arc
 Agusan-Davao Basin
 Mindanao Pacific Cordillera
 Daguma Range
 Cotabato Basin
 Saranggani Block
 Pujada Block
 South China Sea Basin
 Sulu Sea Basin
 Celebes Sea Basin
 Philippine Sea Basin

References

Geology of the Philippines
P